Thyroid hormone receptor-associated protein 3 is a protein that in humans is encoded by the THRAP3 gene.

References

Further reading